Pallas Athene is a c. 1655 oil-on-canvas painting by Rembrandt, now in the Calouste Gulbenkian Museum in Lisbon.

A print of Pallas Athene in the 1659 parade for the marriage of Countess Henriette Catherine of Nassau to John George II of Anhalt-Dessau is similar in pose and costume to the painting. The goddess was played by the artist's son Titus van Rijn, which has led to the theory that he based it on Titus' appearance in the parade. Catherine II of Russia bought the painting from count Baudouin in Paris in 1781 via Melchior Grimm. She then gave it to her lover Alexander Lanskoy and it was later transferred to the Hermitage Museum. On 27 June 1930 it was bought by its present owner via Antikvariat, an art dealer.

References

External links
Rembrandt 1669/1969, Rijksmuseum, Amsterdam, 13 September – 30 November 1969, cat.nr. 19.

1655 paintings
Paintings of Athena
Paintings in the collection of the Calouste Gulbenkian Museum
Mythological paintings by Rembrandt